Crestview Hills is a home rule-class city in Kenton County, Kentucky, in the United States. The population was 3,148 at the 2010 census.

Crestview Hills is located in Northern KY. Interstate 275 travels through the city.  Interstate 71/75 lies close to the city border.  It is home to the Crestview Hills Town Center, the Summit Hills Country Club, Five Seasons Country Club, and Thomas More University.  It is also adjacent to St. Elizabeth Hospital, which has many offices in Crestview Hills' Thomas More Office Park.

Geography
Crestview Hills is located at  (39.026398, -84.566543). Its neighborhoods include: Lookout Farm, Old Crestview, College Park, Summit Lakes, and Grandview Summit.

Government
The City of Crestview Hills is governed by a mayor and six city council members. Additionally, the City of Crestview Hills is staffed by a City Administrator, Finance Officer/Treasurer, City Attorney, City Clerk, City Engineer and Public Works Director. Elections for council members are held every even numbered year and the mayor is elected every four years.

The current mayor of Crestview Hills is Paul Meier.

Demographics

As of the census of 2010, there were 3,148 people, 1,388 households, and 756 families residing in the city. The racial makeup of the city was 95.5% White, 2.1% African American, 0.1% Native American, 1.0% Asian, 0.3% Pacific Islander, 0.2% from other races, and 0.90% from two or more races. Hispanic or Latino of any race were 0.52% of the population.

There were 1,388 households, out of which 17.7% had children under the age of 18 living with them, 43.0% were married couples living together, 7.6% had a female householder with no husband present, and 45.5% were non-families. 39.5% of all households were made up of individuals, and 20.3% had someone living alone who was 65 years of age or older. The average household size was 2.07 and the average family size was 2.79.

In the city the population was spread out, with 23.6% under the age of 18, 8.2% from 18 to 24, 19% from 25 to 44, 26.9% from 45 to 64, and 22% who were 65 years of age or older. The median age was 44.3 years. For every 100 females, there were 89.3 males. For every 100 females age 18 and over, there were 85.6 males.

The median income for a household in the city was $71,696, and the median income for a family was $97,368. Males had a median income of $73,654 versus $56,414 for females. The per capita income for the city was $45,549. About 2.5% of families and 5.1% of the population were below the poverty line, including 11.1% of those age 65 or over.

Education
Crestview Hills is home to Thomas More University, founded in 1921 by the Benedictine Sisters as Villa Madonna College. Serving over 2,000 students, the college is ranked by Money Magazine as one of the "Best College Buys" in higher education and by the Carnegie Foundation, which praises the college as a "selective liberal arts college." Thomas More was also ranked as one of the Best Colleges (Regional Universities – South) by U.S. News & World Report for 2014.

As a part of Crestview Hills, Thomas More University is an important partner in the community by offering a variety of education and social outreach opportunities for residents. Recent programs have included Division III sporting events, theater productions, music concerts and guest speakers. Thomas More also offers non-traditional students the ability to earn their MBA degree through an evening program that allows learners to continue working during the day.

Thomas More University offers its students and the community the chance to see the stars with the Thomas More Observatory. The observatory routinely offers open house events where the public can attend a lecture followed by a night sky viewing.

Crestview Hills is also located in the Kenton County Public School District and also has a variety of nearby private school options available to residents.

Economy
Crestview Hills is home to the Crestview Hills Town Center, which features many retail shops in their outdoor pavilion shopping center. Among these include Dillard's, Bed, Bath, & Beyond, Sunglass Hut, White House Black Market, Victoria's Secret, and Joseph A. Bank. Eateries in the area also include Starbucks, McAlister's Deli, Moe's Southwest Grill, Applebee's, TGI Friday's, and Panera Bread. A Trader Joe's location also opened there in July 2021.

Crestview Hills offers approximately 1,877,374 square foot of commercial office space, with the largest contributor coming from the expansive Thomas More Research/Office Park. Businesses with headquarters in Crestview Hills include:
 Columbia Sussex Corporation
 Waltz Business Systems
 Flottman Company
 FUSIONWRX Inc, a Flottman Company
 Whitehorse Freight

Other major employers in the area have also begun expanding into the Office Park including Cincinnati Children's Hospital Medical Center,  and St. Elizabeth Health Care.

References

External links
 City website
Richwood Tahoe Railroad - official website

Cities in Kenton County, Kentucky
Cities in Kentucky